Space Launch Complex 20 (SLC-20), previously designated Launch Complex 20 (LC-20), is a launch site at Cape Canaveral Space Force Station, Florida. SLC-20 is located at the northern terminus of ICBM Road, between Space Launch Complex 19 and
Space Launch Complex 34.

History 

The facility was constructed by the United States Air Force in the late 1950s for the Titan I Missile Program, modified in 1964 for the Titan III Program, and further modified in the late 1980s for the Starbird launch vehicles associated with the shuttle Starlab mission. Several Titan I rockets and four or five Titan III rockets were launched from SLC-20. SLC-20 was deactivated in 1996.

In 1999, the site was re-activated to support new launch facilities under the direction of Space Florida for commercial launches. The re-activation included upgrades to Launch Pad A and the construction of a new building along the perimeter road, northeast of the blockhouse.

In 2006, the site was being used by NASA's Advanced Technology Development Center (ATDC), a research and development project to provide infrastructure to test, demonstrate and qualify new spaceport technologies. The site was shared with the Florida Air National Guard.

In February 2019, Space Florida leased the site to Firefly Aerospace so that Firefly could launch small-lift launch vehicles from the Florida Space Coast launch location on easterly launch azimuths.  Firefly plans to develop both manufacturing facilities at a nearby Space Florida business park as well as the launch site. Firefly has a similar lease arrangement, this one from the US government, on the US West Coast at Vandenberg Space Launch Complex 2 for a launch facility that has overwater launch azimuths for high-inclination and polar orbital trajectories.

Notes

External links
Spaceport Authority Selects Lockheed Martin to Operate Launch Pads
Complex 20 Live Video

Cape Canaveral Space Force Station

Launch complexes of the United States Space Force